The Ponte dell'Accademia is one of only four bridges to span the Grand Canal in Venice, Italy. It crosses near the southern end of the canal, and is named for the Accademia di Belle Arti di Venezia, which from 1807 to 2004 was housed in the Scuola della Carità together with the Gallerie dell'Accademia, which is still there. The bridge links the sestieri of Dorsoduro and San Marco.

A bridge on the site was first suggested as early as 1488. The provveditore Luca Trum proposed in the council to build two bridges across the Grand Canal, one here and the other at Santa Sofia. The members of the council, however, laughed at him, and the motion was not even put to the vote. The original steel structure, designed by Alfred Neville, opened on 20 November 1854, but was demolished and replaced by a wooden bridge designed by Eugenio Miozzi and opened in 1933, despite widespread hopes for a stone bridge.

Lovers have attempted to attach padlocks ("love locks") to the metal hand rails of the bridge, but Venetian authorities have successfully cracked down on this.

References

External links

Panoramic virtual tour of Ponte dell Accademia & Accademia gallery
High-resolution 360° Panoramas of Accademia Bridge | Art Atlas

Bridges in Venice
Ponte dell'Accademia
Arch bridges
Pedestrian bridges in Italy
Wooden bridges in Italy
Bridges completed in 1985